{{DISPLAYTITLE:Prostaglandin-E2 9-reductase}}

In enzymology, a prostaglandin-E2 9-reductase is an enzyme that catalyzes the chemical reaction

(5Z,13E)-(15S)-9alpha,11alpha,15-trihydroxyprosta-5,13-dienoate + NADP+  (5Z,13E)-(15S)-11alpha,15-dihydroxy-9-oxoprosta-5,13-dienoate + NADPH + H+

Thus, the two substrates of this enzyme are (5Z,13E)-(15S)-9alpha,11alpha,15-trihydroxyprosta-5,13-dienoate and NADP+, whereas its 3 products are (5Z,13E)-(15S)-11alpha,15-dihydroxy-9-oxoprosta-5,13-dienoate, NADPH, and H+.

This enzyme belongs to the family of oxidoreductases, specifically those acting on the CH-OH group of donor with NAD+ or NADP+ as acceptor. The systematic name of this enzyme class is (5Z,13E)-(15S)-9alpha,11alpha,15-trihydroxyprosta-5,13-dienoate:NADP+ 9-oxidoreductase. Other names in common use include PGE2-9-OR, reductase, 15-hydroxy-9-oxoprostaglandin, 9-keto-prostaglandin E2 reductase, 9-ketoprostaglandin reductase, PGE-9-ketoreductase, PGE2 9-oxoreductase, PGE2 reductase-9-ketoreductase, prostaglandin 9-ketoreductase, prostaglandin E 9-ketoreductase, and prostaglandin E2 reductase-9-oxoreductase. This enzyme participates in arachidonic acid metabolism.

Structural studies 

References 

 
 
 
 

EC 1.1.1
NADPH-dependent enzymes
Enzymes of known structure